John Mullan (8 September 1871 – 1 October 1941) was an Irish-born Australian politician.

Early life
Born in Dublin, where he was educated, he migrated to Australia in 1889, becoming a clerk and railway worker. He was an organiser of the Charters Towers Miners' Union and the Australian Workers' Union.

Politics
In 1908 he was elected to the Legislative Assembly of Queensland as the Labor member for Charters Towers, where he remained until 1912. In 1913 he was elected to the Australian Senate as a Labor Senator for Queensland. He remained in the Senate until his defeat in 1917, after which he returned to the Queensland Legislative Assembly as the member for Flinders in 1918. He served as Attorney-General from 1920 to 1929. In 1932, he changed seats, moving to Carpentaria, and resumed his position as Attorney-General, which he retained until 1940.

Later life

Mullan died in 1941 and was accorded a State funeral which took place from St Stephen's Cathedral to the Toowong Cemetery.

References

External links 

 Torres Strait Islands Photograph Album 1935, State Library of Queensland. Photograph album showcasing Queensland Attorney-General Hon. John Mullan's 1935 official visit to the Torres Strait Islands and the Gulf of Carpentaria.

Australian Labor Party members of the Parliament of Australia
Members of the Australian Senate for Queensland
Members of the Australian Senate
1871 births
1941 deaths
Burials at Toowong Cemetery
Attorneys-General of Queensland
20th-century Australian politicians
Irish emigrants to Australia